The MOD Ontology is the name given to the upper ontology intended to support the UK Ministry of Defence's Enterprise Architecture Programme, specifically MODAF. The ontology project is at an early stage and is being led by DG-Info (ICAD). 

The current plan as of March 2008 is to investigate potential applications for ontology in the MOD. Wherever possible, MOD is seeking to re-use existing ontology standards, an obvious candidate therefore is the ontology being developed by the IDEAS Group.

Implementations
 GeoPolitical Ontology Demonstrator - this uses the IDEAS naming pattern (for de-confliction of country codes, etc.), the whole-part pattern (for geopolitical structure) and the overlaps pattern (for borders). It can be downloaded from https://web.archive.org/web/20130525211714/http://www.modaf.com/News/69/mod-ontology-demonstrator-released. (Note: this link is no longer active and a download of this ontology is no longer available)

Ontology (information science)